María Elena Ramírez (born 25 September 1951) is a Mexican gymnast. She competed in six events at the 1968 Summer Olympics.

References

1951 births
Living people
Mexican female artistic gymnasts
Olympic gymnasts of Mexico
Gymnasts at the 1968 Summer Olympics
Sportspeople from Mexico City
20th-century Mexican women